The 2006–07 National Football League was the 11th and last season of the National Football League, the top Indian professional league for association football clubs, before it is rebranded as I-League from 2007–08 season as part of turning the league into a professional league.

Overview
It was contested by 10 teams, and Dempo won the championship under the coach Armando Colaco. It was their second title. JCT came second and Mahindra came third. Mohammedan and HAL (Hindustan Aeronotics Limited) and were relegated from the league for the next edition of National Football League 2007-08.

League standings

Season statistics

Top scorers

Hat-tricks

Note: (H) – Home; (A) – Away

Season awards

References

External links 
 11th National Football League at Rec.Sport.Soccer Statistics Foundation
 Season home at Rediff.com

National Football League (India) seasons
2006–07 in Indian football leagues
India